The 2008 Masters France was a non-ATP affiliated exhibition tennis tournament. It was the first edition of the event held in Toulouse, France from December 18 through December 21, 2008. Only a men's singles tournament was held.

The tournament was open to the top eight French players who had performed best at ATP Tour events held in France during 2008 (at Metz, Lyon, Marseille and the Masters Series event in Paris). Some players had to pull out and were replaced by the next best French player (see the Masters France article.

Review

Players
Nicolas Mahut, Jo-Wilfried Tsonga and Richard Gasquet (as a wildcard) were due to play but they all pulled out before the tournament began, due to lack of preparation after injury on the part of Gasquet and, in Tsonga's case, in order to concentrate on preparing for next season.

Josselin Ouanna replaced Mahut two days before the start, while Arnaud Clément took the place of Gasquet and Tsonga was replaced by Michaël Llodra.

Key
DNQ = Did not qualify
DNP = Did not play 
W = Winner
F = Final
SF = Semi-final
QF = Quarter-final
R1/2/3 = Round 1/2/3

Original qualifiers:
Jo-Wilfried Tsonga - Marseille: R1, Metz: DNP, Lyon:SF, Paris: W
Nicolas Mahut - Marseille: QF, Metz: R2, Lyon: R1, Paris: DNQ
Richard Gasquet - Marseille: R2, Metz: DNP, Lyon: R2, Paris: DNP

Champions

 Gilles Simon def.  Michaël Llodra 5–7, 7–6(7) retired

References

External links

 
Masters France, 2008
Masters France